Robert Adam  (3 July 17283 March 1792) was a British neoclassical architect, interior designer and furniture designer. He was the son of William Adam (1689–1748), Scotland's foremost architect of the time, and trained under him. With his older brother John, Robert took on the family business, which included lucrative work for the Board of Ordnance, after William's death.

In 1754, he left for Rome, spending nearly five years on the continent studying architecture under Charles-Louis Clérisseau and Giovanni Battista Piranesi. On his return to Britain he established a practice in London, where he was joined by his younger brother James. Here he developed the "Adam Style", and his theory of "movement" in architecture, based on his studies of antiquity and became one of the most successful and fashionable architects in the country. Adam held the post of Architect of the King's Works from 1761 to 1769.

Robert Adam was a leader of the first phase of the classical revival in England and Scotland from around 1760 until his death. He influenced the development of Western architecture, both in Europe and in North America. Adam designed interiors and fittings as well as houses. Much of his work consisted of remodelling existing houses, as well as contributions to Edinburgh's townscape and designing romantic pseudo-mediaeval country houses in Scotland.

He served as the member of Parliament for Kinross-shire from 1768 to 1774.

Biography

Early life

Adam was born on 3 July 1728 at Gladney House in Kirkcaldy, Fife, the second son of Mary Robertson (1699–1761), the daughter of William Robertson of Gladney, and architect William Adam. As a child he was noted as having a "feeble constitution". From 1734 at the age of six Adam attended the Royal High School, Edinburgh where he learned Latin (from the second year lessons were conducted in Latin) until he was 15, he was taught to read works by Virgil, Horace, Sallust and parts of Cicero and in his final year Livy. 

In autumn 1743, he matriculated at the University of Edinburgh, and compulsory classes for all students were: the Greek language, logic, metaphysics and natural philosophy. Students could choose three elective subjects, Adam attended classes in mathematics, taught by Colin Maclaurin, and anatomy, taught by Alexander Monro primus. His studies were interrupted by the arrival of Bonnie Prince Charlie and his Highlanders, who occupied Edinburgh during the 1745 Jacobite rising. At the end of the year, Robert fell seriously ill for some months, and it seems unlikely that he returned to university, having completed only two years of study.

On his recovery from illness in 1746, he joined his elder brother John as apprentice to his father. He assisted William Adam on projects such as the building of Inveraray Castle and the continuing extensions of Hopetoun House. William's position as Master Mason to the Board of Ordnance also began to generate much work, as the Highlands were fortified following the failed Jacobite revolt. Robert's early ambition was to be an artist rather than architect, and the style of his early sketches in the manner of Salvator Rosa are reflected in his earliest surviving architectural drawings, which show picturesque gothic follies. William Adam died in June 1748, and left Dowhill, a part of the Blair Adam estate which included Dowhill Castle, to Robert. From his father, Robert inherited an extensive library and extended it.

Architectural practice in Edinburgh

On William Adam's death, John Adam inherited both the family business and the position of Master Mason to the Board of Ordnance. He immediately took Robert into partnership, later to be joined by James Adam. The Adam Brothers' first major commission was the decoration of the grand state apartments on the first floor at Hopetoun House, followed by their first "new build" at Dumfries House. For the Board of Ordnance, the brothers were the main contractor at Fort George, a large modern fort near Inverness designed by military engineer Colonel Skinner. Visits to this project, begun in 1750, would occupy the brothers every summer for the next 10 years, and, along with works at many other barracks and forts, provided Robert with a solid foundation in practical building.

In the winter of 1749–1750, Adam travelled to London with his friend, the poet John Home. He took the opportunity for architectural study, visiting Wilton, designed by Inigo Jones, and the Queens Hermitage in Richmond by Roger Morris. His sketchbook of the trip also shows a continuing interest in gothic architecture.

Among his friends at Edinburgh were the philosophers Adam Ferguson and David Hume and the artist Paul Sandby whom he met in the Highlands. Other Edinburgh acquaintances included Gilbert Elliot, William Wilkie, John Home and Alexander Wedderburn.

Grand Tour

On 3 October 1754, Robert Adam in the company of his brother James (who went as far as Brussels) set off from Edinburgh for his Grand Tour, stopping for a few days in London, where they visited the Mansion House, London, St Stephen Walbrook, St Paul's Cathedral, Windsor, Berkshire, in the company of Thomas Sandby who showed them his landscaping at Windsor Great Park and Virginia Water Lake. They sailed from Dover arriving in Calais on 28 October 1754. He joined Charles Hope-Weir, brother of the Earl of Hopetoun in Brussels and together they travelled to Rome. Hope agreed to take Adam on the tour at the suggestion of his uncle, the Marquess of Annandale, who had undertaken the Grand Tour himself. While in Brussels the pair attended a Play and Masquerade, as well as visiting churches and palaces in the city. Travelling on to Tournai, then Lille, where they visited the Citadal designed by Sébastien Le Prestre de Vauban. By 12 November 1754 Adam and Hope were in Paris where they took lodgings in Hotel de Notre Dame.

Adam and Hope travelled on to Italy together, before falling out in Rome over travelling expenses and accommodation. Robert Adam stayed on in Rome until 1757, studying classical architecture and honing his drawing skills. His tutors included the French architect and artist Charles-Louis Clérisseau, and the Italian artist Giovanni Battista Piranesi. Here, he became acquainted with the work of the pioneering classical archaeologist and art historian, theorist Johann Joachim Winckelmann. On his return journey, Adam and Clerisseau spent time intensively studying the ruins of Diocletian's Palace at Spalatro in Dalmatia (now known as Split, in modern Croatia). These studies were later published as Ruins of the Palace of the Emperor Diocletian at Spalatro in Dalmatia in 1764.

Architectural practice in London

He returned to Britain in 1758 and set up in business in London with his brother James Adam. They focused on designing complete schemes for the decoration and furnishing of houses. Palladian design was popular, and Robert designed a number of country houses in this style, but he evolved a new, more flexible style incorporating elements of classical Roman design alongside influences from Greek, Byzantine and Baroque styles. The Adam brothers' success can also be attributed to a desire to design everything down to the smallest detail, ensuring a sense of unity in their design. In Adam interiors, all the furnishings were custom designed to accord with the decoration of the room in a unified harmony. Often the carpets were woven to match the intricate patterns of the ceiling above, while every fitting including sconces, mirrors, and doorknobs also received a custom design emulating the motifs of the room.

Adams' practice was not without mishap, however. In 1768 the Adam brothers purchased a 99-year lease for a marshy plot of land beside the Thames in Westminster, where they built a 24-house terrace development known as the Adelphi. The project was very ambitious and is the first instance where terraced houses were designed individually to give unified harmony to the whole development (previously terraced houses were built to one replicated design side-by-side, around a square). However, the project became a white elephant for Robert and his brothers, with uncertain financing and costs spiralling out of control. The houses were built on a huge artificial terrace resting on vaulted substructures on the level of the Thames, which Robert Adam was certain could be leased to the British government as warehouses. However, this interest failed to materialize, and the Adam brothers were left with huge debts and in 1772 had to lay off 3,000 workmen and cease building. Adam himself moved into one of the houses in the Adelphi, along with supportive friends like David Garrick and Josiah Wedgewood, who opened a showroom for his ceramics in one of the houses. In 1774, a public lottery was held to raise funds for the brothers, which allowed them to avert bankruptcy.

Public life

Adam was elected a fellow of the Society for the Encouragement of Arts, Manufactures and Commerce in 1758 and of the Society of Antiquaries in 1761, the same year he was appointed Architect of the King's Works (jointly with Sir William Chambers). His younger brother James succeeded him in this post when he relinquished the role in 1768 to devote more time to his elected office as member of Parliament for Kinross-shire.

Architectural style
Adam rejected the Palladian style, as introduced to England by Inigo Jones, and advocated by Lord Burlington, as "ponderous" and "disgustful". However, he continued their tradition of drawing inspiration directly from classical antiquity, during his four-year stay in Europe. Adam developed a new style of architectural decoration, one which was more archaeologically accurate than past Neoclassical styles, but nonetheless innovative and not bound only by ancient precedents. In Works in Architecture, co-authored with his brother James, the brothers stated that Graeco-Roman examples should "serve as models which we should imitate, and as standards by which we ought to judge." The discoveries in Herculaneum and Pompeii ongoing at the time provided ample material for Robert Adam to draw on for inspiration.

The Adam brothers' principle of "movement" was largely Robert's conception, although the theory was first written down by James. "Movement" relied on dramatic contrasts and diversity of form, and drew on the picturesque aesthetic. The first volume of the Adam brother's Works (1773) cited Kedleston Hall, designed by Robert in 1761, as an outstanding example of movement in architecture.

By contrasting room sizes and decorative schemes, Adam applied the concept of movement to his interiors also. His style of decoration, described by Pevsner as "Classical Rococo", drew on Roman "grotesque" stucco decoration.

Influence
 
Adam's work had influenced the direction of architecture and design across the western world. In England his collaboration with Thomas Chippendale resulted in some of the finest neoclassicist designs of the time, most notably in the Harewood House collection of Chippendale's work. In North America, the Federal style owes much to neoclassicism as practised by Adam. In Europe, Adam notably influenced Charles Cameron, the Scotsman who designed Tsarskoye Selo and other Russian palaces for Catherine the Great. However, by the time of his death, Adam's neoclassicism was being superseded in Britain by a more severe, Greek phase of the classical revival, as practised by James "Athenian" Stuart. The Adam brothers employed several draughtsmen who would go on to establish themselves as architects, including George Richardson, and the Italian Joseph Bonomi, who Robert originally hired in Rome.

Written works
During their lifetime Robert and James Adam published two volumes of their designs, Works in Architecture of Robert and James Adam (in 1773–1778 and 1779; a third volume was published posthumously, in 1822).

Death and burial
Adam had long suffered from stomach and bowel problems, probably caused by a peptic ulcer and irritable bowel syndrome. While at home – 11 Albemarle Street, London – on 1 March 1792, one of the ulcers burst, and on 3 March Adam died.

The funeral was held on 10 March; he was buried in the south aisle of Westminster Abbey. The pall-bearers were several of his clients: Henry Scott, 3rd Duke of Buccleuch; George Coventry, 6th Earl of Coventry; James Maitland, 8th Earl of Lauderdale; David Murray, 2nd Earl of Mansfield; Lord Frederick Campbell and Sir William Pulteney, 5th Baronet.

Knowing he was dying, he drafted his will on 2 March 1792. Having never married, Adam left his estate to his sisters Elizabeth Adam and Margaret Adam.

His obituary appeared in the March 1792 edition of The Gentleman's Magazine:

It is somewhat remarkable that the Arts should be deprived at the same time of two of their greatest ornaments, Sir Joshua Reynolds and Mr Adam: and it is difficult to say which of them excelled most in his particular profession... 
Mr Adam produced a total change in the architecture of this country: and his fertile genius in elegant ornament was not confined to the decoration of buildings, but has been diffused to every branch of manufacture. His talents extend beyond the lie of his own profession: he displayed in his numerous drawings in landscape a luxuriance of composition, and an effect of light and shadow, which have scarcely been equalled...to the last period of his life, Mr Adam displayed an increasing vigour of genius and refinement of taste: for in the space of one year preceding his death, he designed eight great public works, besides twenty five private buildings, so various in their style, and so beautiful in their composition, that they have been allowed by the best judges, sufficient of themselves, to establish his fame unrivalled as an artist.

He left nearly 9,000 drawings, 8,856 of which (by both Robert and James Adam) were subsequently purchased in 1833 for £200 by the architect John Soane and are now at the Soane Museum in London.

List of architectural works

Public buildings
 Fort George, Scotland, the buildings within the fort were designed by William Adam, after his death his sons oversaw completion (1748–69)
 The Argyll Arms, Inveraray (1750–56)
 The Town House, Inveraray (1750–57)
 Royal Exchange, Edinburgh, with his brother John Adam (1753–54)
 Screen in front of the Old Admiralty, Whitehall, London (1760)
 Kedleston Hotel, Quarndon (1760)
 Little Market Hall, High Wycombe, Buckinghamshire (1761) later altered
 Riding School, Edinburgh (1763) demolished
 Courts of Justice and Corn Market, Hertford, Hertfordshire, now Shire Hall (1768). Altered, but partially restored to original design. A joint project with James Adam.
 Pulteney Bridge, Bath (1770)
 County House, Kinross (1771)
 Royal Society for the encouragement of Arts, Manufactures & Commerce (1772)
 Register House, Edinburgh (1774–1789)
 The Market Cross, Bury St Edmunds, refaced and upper floor added (a theatre now art gallery) (1776)
 Theatre Royal, Drury Lane, London, remodelled, (1775) demolished
 Red Lion Inn, Pontefract (1776)
 Drummonds Bank, Charing Cross, London (1777–78) demolished
Home House, London (1777)
 Old College, University of Edinburgh, (1788-onwards) completed to an amended design by William Henry Playfair 1831
 The Bridewell, Edinburgh, (1791) demolished
 The Assembly Rooms, Glasgow (1791–94) demolished
 Trades Hall, Glasgow, Scotland (1791–1792) (completed 1792–1802 by his brothers)
 The Royal Infirmary, Glasgow (1791–94) rebuilt 1914
 Coutts Bank enclosed bridge, John Adam Street (1799) later demolished

Churches
 Yester Chapel, Lothian, new west front in Gothic style (1753)
 Cumnock church, Ayrshire (1753–54) demolished
 St. Mary Magdalene, Croome Park, interior (1761–63) the church was designed by Lancelot "Capability" Brown
 St. Andrew's Church, Gunton Hall, Gunton, Norfolk (1769)
 St Mary's, Mistley (1776) only the towers survive
 St. George's Chapel, Edinburgh, (1792) demolished

Mausoleums
 William Adam Mausoleum, Greyfriars Kirkyard (1753–55)
 Bowood House Mausoleum (1761–64)
 David Hume Mausoleum, Old Calton Cemetery (1777–78)
 Templetown Mausoleum, Castle Upton, County Antrim Ireland (1789) for 2nd Lord Templetown.
 Johnstone Family Mausoleum, Ochil Road graveyard, Alva, Clackmannanshire (1789–90)
 Johnstone Family Mausoleum, Westerkirk graveyard, near Bentpath, Dumfries and Galloway 1790

Urban domestic work
 Little Wallingford House, Whitehall, London, alterations (1761) demolished
 Lansdowne House, Berkeley Square, London (1762–67), partially demolished, the Dining Room is in the Metropolitan Museum of Art and the Drawing Room is in Philadelphia Museum of Art
 34 Pall Mall, London (1765–66) demolished
 Langford House, Mary Street, Dublin, Ireland. (1765) First recorded work in Ireland remodelling of house for Rt. Hon. Hercules Langford Rowley. Demolished 1931.
 16 Hanover Square, London, alterations (1766–67) demolished
 Deputy Ranger's lodge, Green Park, London (1768–71) demolished in the 19th century
 The Adelphi development, London (1768–1775) mostly demolished 1930s, a ceiling & fireplace are in the Victoria and Albert Museum
 Chandos House, London (1770–71)
 8 Queen Street, Edinburgh (1770–71) originally designed for Lord Chief Baron Ord, now housing the Royal College of Physicians of Edinburgh
 Mansfield Street, London (1770–72)
 Northumberland House, London, alterations (1770) demolished, parts of the Glass Drawing Room survive in the Victoria and Albert Museum
 20 St. James's Square (1771–74)
 33 St. James's Square (1771–73)
 Ashburnham House, Dover Street, London, alterations (1773)
 Derby House, 26 Grosvenor Square (1773–74) demolished
 Portland Place, London (1773–94) (only a few houses survive)
 11 St. James's Square (1774–76)
 Frederick's Place, London (1775–78)
 Roxburghe House, Hanover Square, London (1776–78) demolished
 Home House, London (1777 – before 1784)
 31 (now 17) Hill Street, London alterations (1777–79)
 Apsley House, London (1778) altered
 Cumberland House, Pall Mall, London, alterations and interiors (1780–88) demolished
 Marlborough House, Brighton (1786)
 Fitzroy Square, London (1790–94) only the south and east sides were built
 Charlotte Square (north side), Edinburgh (1791–94)
 169–185 High Street, Glasgow (1793) demolished
 1–3 Robert Street

Country houses with major work
 Dumfries House, Ayrshire (1754–1759)
 Hatchlands Park, Surrey, interiors (1756)
 Douglas Castle, Lanarkshire (1757–1761)
 Paxton House, near Berwick-upon-Tweed (1758)
 Shardeloes, Amersham, Buckinghamshire (altered and completed the original design by Stiff Leadbetter) (1759–63)
 Harewood House, West Yorkshire (1759–1771)
 Kedleston Hall, near Derby (1759–1765)
 Mellerstain House, Kelso, Scottish Borders (1760–1768)
 Ugbrooke, Devon
 Osterley Park, west London (1761–1780)
 Mersham le Hatch, Mersham, Ashford, Kent (1762–1766)
 Syon House interior, Brentford (1762–1769)
 Luton Hoo, Bedfordshire (1766–1770) later extensively reconstructed 1816 by Robert Smirke and other architects later
 Nostell Priory (1766–80)
 Newby Hall, Newby Boroughbridge, North Yorkshire (1767–76)
 Kenwood House, Hampstead, London (1768)
 Saltram House, Plymouth, Devon (1768–69)
 Bowood House, near Calne, Wiltshire, Diocletian wing, and other interiors (1770)
 Wedderburn Castle, Duns, Scottish Borders, Berwickshire (1770–1778)
 Culzean Castle, South Ayrshire (1772–1790)
 Moreton Hall, Suffolk (1773–1776), building and interiors
 Stowe, Buckinghamshire (1774)
 Moreton Hall, Bury St Edmund (1783)
 Brasted Place, Kent
 Pitfour Castle, Tayside, attributed
 Seton Castle, East Lothian (1789)
 Newliston, Lothian (1789)
 Dalquharran Castle, South Ayrshire (1789–1792); now a ruin
 Airthrey Castle, Stirlingshire (1790–1791)
 Balbardie House, Lothian (1792); demolished
 Gosford House, near Longniddry, East Lothian (1790–1800)

Garden buildings and follies
 Stables, Inveraray Castle, joint work with his brother John (1758–60)
 North Lodge, Kedleston Hall (1759)
 Circular and Octagon pavilion, La Trappe, Hammersmith (1760) for George Bubb Dodington (demolished)
 Conservatory Croome Park (1760)
 Rotunda Croome Park, attributed (1760)
 Old Rectory, Kedleston Hall
 Entrance screen, Moor Park, Hertfordshire (1763)
 The Conservatory, Osterley Park (1763)
 Bridge, Audley End House, Essex
 Tea Pavilion, Moor Park, Hertfordshire
 Gatehouse Kimbolton Castle
 Bridge, Kedleston Hall (1764)
 Estate Village Lowther, Cumbria (1766)
 Dunstall 'Castle' and Garden Alcove, Croome Park (1766)
 Entrance arch, Croome Court (1767)
 Entrance Screen, Cullen House, Cullen, Moray (1767)
 Bridge, Osterley Park (c. 1768)
 Entrance screen, Syon House (1769)
 Fishing, Boat & Bath House, Kedleston Hall (1770–71)
 Circular Temple, Audley End House, Essex (1771)
 Lion Bridge, Alnwick (1773)
 Stag Lodge, Saltram House, Devon
 The Stables, Featherstone entrance & Huntwick arch Nostell Priory (1776)
 Wyke Green Lodges, Osterley, Middlesex (1777); remodelled
 the Home Farm, Culzean Castle, Ayrshire (1777–79)
 Brizlee Tower, Alnwick, Gothic tower (1777–81)
 Oswald's Temple, Auchincruive, Ayrshire (1778)
 'Ruined' arch and viaduct, Culzean Castle (1780)
 The semi-circular conservatory, Osterley Park (1780)
 Tea House Bridge, Audley End House, Essex (1782)
 The Stables, Culzean Castle
 Stables, Castle Upton, Templepatrick, Co. Antrim, Ireland. (1788–89). Important range of office buildings in castle style.
 Montagu Bridge, Dalkeith Palace, Lothian (1792)
 Loftus Hall, Fethard-on-sea, Co. Wexford, Ireland. Date unknown. Proposed gates.
 Lion Gate and Lodge, Syon Park, London. Date unknown.

Country houses with minor work
 Hopetoun House, West Lothian (interiors) (1750–54), the house was designed by William Adam
 Ballochmyle House, Ayrshire
 Compton Verney House, added the wings and interiors (1760–63)
 Croome Park, three interiors: the Library the fittings are in the Victoria and Albert Museum, Gallery and Tapestry Room this is now in the Metropolitan Museum of Art, (1760–65)
 Audley End House, redecoration of ground floor rooms (1763–65)
 Goldsborough Hall, near Knaresborough, North Yorkshire (1764–1765)
 Alnwick Castle, Northumberland (interiors) (1766) destroyed when Anthony Salvin created the current state rooms
 Woolton Hall, Woolton, Merseyside (1772), remodelled main façade and the interior
 Headfort House, County Meath, Ireland. Internal work, including stairs and notably the Great Eating Room (1775) for Thomas Taylour, 1st. Earl Bective.
 Wormleybury, Hertfordshire, internal work including entrance hall & staircase (1777)
 Downhill, near Coleraine, County Londonderry, Ireland. (1780) Design for dining room. Not executed. House is now a crumbling ruin.
 Moccas Court, Moccas, Herefordshire, internal work including drawing room (1781)
 Castle Upton, Templepartick, Co. Antrim, Ireland. Remodelling of house. (1782–83) for 1st. Lord Templetown.
 Archerfield House, Lothian, internal work including library (1791)
 Summerhill House, Co. Meath, Ireland. Date unknown. Proposed alterations. House now demolished.

Official appointments

See also
 Adam style
 :Category:Robert Adam buildings

References

Sources
 Adam, Robert (1764) Ruins of the palace of the Emperor Diocletian at Spalatro in Dalmatia
 Bolton, Arthur T. (1922, reprinted 1984) The Architecture of Robert & James Adam, 1785–1794, 2 volumes 
 Curl, James Stevens (2006) Oxford Dictionary of Architecture and Landscape Architecture 2nd Edition. Oxford University Press. 
 Fleming, John (1962) Robert Adam and his Circle John Murray 
 Glendinning, Miles, and McKechnie, Aonghus, (2004) Scottish Architecture, Thames and Hudson. 
 Graham, Roderick (2009) Arbiter of Elegance: A Biography of Robert Adam (Birlinn)
 Harris, Eileen (1963) The Furniture of Robert Adam Alec Tiranti, London. .
 Harris, Eileen (2001) The Genius of Robert Adam: His Interiors 
 Lees-Milne, James (1947) The Age of Adam
 Pevsner, Nikolaus (1951) An Outline of European Architecture 2nd Edition. Pelican
 Roderick, Graham (2009) Arbiter of Elegance A Biography of Robert Adam. Birlinn 
 
 Stillman, Damie (1966) The Decorative Work of Robert Adam 
 Tait, A. A. (2004)  "Adam, Robert (1728–1792)", Oxford Dictionary of National Biography, Oxford University Press
 Belamarić, Joško – Šverko, Ana (eds.): Robert Adam and Diocletian's Palace in Split, Zagreb 2017,

Further reading

External links

 

1728 births
1792 deaths
People from Kirkcaldy
People educated at the Royal High School, Edinburgh
Alumni of the University of Edinburgh
Independent members of the House of Commons of Great Britain
Members of the Parliament of Great Britain for Scottish constituencies
British MPs 1768–1774
Fellows of the Royal Society of Edinburgh
Fellows of the Royal Society
Fellows of the Society of Antiquaries of London
People of the Scottish Enlightenment
Politics of Perth and Kinross
Scottish antiquarians
18th-century Scottish architects
Scottish furniture designers
Scottish interior designers
British neoclassical architects
Burials at Westminster Abbey
Fellows of the Society of Antiquaries of Scotland